Bourmont is a former commune in the Haute-Marne department in northeastern France. On 1 June 2016, it was merged into the new commune of Bourmont-entre-Meuse-et-Mouzon.

Population

See also
Communes of the Haute-Marne department

References

Former communes of Haute-Marne
Duchy of Bar